Hialeah is a city in Miami-Dade County, Florida, United States. With a population of 223,109 as of the 2020 census, Hialeah is the sixth-largest city in Florida. It is the second largest city by population in the Miami metropolitan area, which was home to an estimated 6,198,782 people at the 2018 census. It is located west-northwest of Miami, and is one of a few places in the county—others being Homestead, Miami Beach, Surfside, Bal Harbour, Sunny Isles Beach, and Golden Beach—to have its own street grid numbered separately from the rest of the county (which is otherwise based on Miami Avenue at Flagler Street in Downtown Miami, the county seat).

The city is notable for its high Hispanic proportion, which at 94.0%, is the second-highest proportion of Hispanic Americans out of any community in the United States outside of Puerto Rico, and the highest proportion among incorporated communities outside of Puerto Rico. Hialeah also has the highest percentage of Cuban and Cuban American residents of any city in the United States, at 73.37% of the population, making them a typical and prominent feature of the city's culture.

Hialeah also has one of the largest Spanish-speaking communities in the country. In 2016, 96.3% of residents reported speaking Spanish at home, and the language is an important part of daily life in the city.

Hialeah is served by the Miami Metrorail at Okeechobee, Hialeah, and Tri-Rail/Metrorail Transfer stations. The Okeechobee and Hialeah stations serve primarily as park-and-ride commuter stations to commuters and residents going into Downtown Miami, and Tri-Rail station to Miami International Airport and north to West Palm Beach.

History

The city's name is most commonly attributed to Muskogee origin, "Haiyakpo" (prairie) and "hili" (pretty) combining in "Hialeah" to mean "pretty prairie". Alternatively, the word is of Seminole origin meaning "Upland Prairie". The city is located upon a large prairie between Biscayne Bay and the Everglades.

This "high prairie" caught the eye of pioneer aviator Glenn Curtiss and Missouri cattleman James H. Bright in 1921. Together, they developed not only the town of Hialeah but also Hialeah Park Race Track. In 1921, the first plat was drawn up, and the town was named.

In the early "Roaring '20s", Hialeah produced significant entertainment contributions. Sporting included the Spanish sport of jai alai and greyhound racing, and media included silent movies like D.W. Griffith's The White Rose which was made at the Miami Movie Studios located in Hialeah. However, the 1926 Miami hurricane brought many of these activities to an end.

In the years since its incorporation in 1925, many historical events and people have been associated with Hialeah. The opening of the horse racing course at Hialeah Park Race Track in 1925 (which was nicknamed the "Grand Dame") received more coverage in the Miami media than any other sporting event in the history of Dade County up to that time and since then there have been countless horse racing histories played out at the world-famous  park. It was considered one of the most grand thoroughbred horse racing parks with its majestic Mediterranean style architecture and was considered the Jewel of Hialeah at the time.

The park's grandeur has attracted millions, included among them are names known around the world such as the Kennedy family, Harry Truman, General Omar Bradley, Winston Churchill, and J.P. Morgan. The Hialeah Park Race Track also holds the dual distinction of being an Audubon Bird Sanctuary due to its famous pink flamingos and being listed on the National Register of Historic Places. The famous aviator Amelia Earhart in 1937 said her final good-byes to the continental U.S. from Hialeah as she left on her ill-fated flight around the world in 1937.

While Hialeah was once envisioned as a playground for the elite, Cuban exiles fleeing Fidel Castro's 1959 revolution, as well as World War II veterans and city planners, transformed the city into a working-class community. Hialeah historian Patricia Fernández-Kelly explained, "It became an affordable Eden." She further describes the city as "a place where different groups have left their imprint while trying to create a sample of what life should be like." Several waves of Cuban exiles, starting after the Cuban Revolution in 1959 and continuing through to the Freedom Flights from 1965 to 1973, the Mariel boatlift in 1980, and the Balseros or boat people of the late 1990s, created what at least one expert has considered the most economically successful immigrant enclave in U.S. history as Hialeah is the only American industrial city that continues to grow.

From a population of 1,500 in 1925, Hialeah has grown faster than most of the 10 larger cities in the state of Florida since the 1960s and holds the rank of Florida's fifth-largest city, with more than 224,000 residents. The city is also one of the largest employers in Dade County.

In January 2009, Forbes magazine listed Hialeah as one of the most boring cities in the United States, citing the city's large population and anonymity in the national media.

Geography

Hialeah is located at  (25.860474, –80.293971).

Climate

According to the Köppen climate classification, Hialeah as a tropical monsoon climate (Am).

Surrounding areas
  Unincorporated Miami-Dade County, Miami Lakes, Opa-locka
  Unincorporated Miami-Dade County    Westview
 Hialeah Gardens, Medley, Miami Springs   Westview, West Little River, Gladeview, Brownsville, Miami
  Miami Springs    Miami
  Hialeah Gardens, Medley, Miami Springs

Demographics

2020 census
As of the 2020 United States census, there were 223,109 people, 75,989 households, and 54,646 families residing in the city.

In this census, the majority of people (about 58%) reported they were of mixed race.  For those who reported only a single race for themselves:

 White alone: 61,023, 66% of those reporting one race and 27% of all respondents
 Blacks or African American alone: 2,695, 3% of those reporting one race and 1% of all respondents
 American Indian and Alaska Native alone: 355, <1% of those reporting one race and <1% of all respondents
 Asian alone: 1,000, 1% of those reporting one race and <1% of all respondents
 Native Hawaiian and other Pacific Islander alone; 23, <1% of those reporting one race and <1% of all respondents
 Some other race alone: 27,925, 30% of those reporting one race and 12.5% of all respondents

Of those reporting they were of mixed race, 129,168 (58%) said they were of two races, 796 (<1%) said they were of three races, 105 said they were of four races and 17 said they were of five races.  The conclusion that can be reached based on this primary data is that the population is extremely ethnically diverse and there is not a majority ethnicity represented.  The majority of people who reported they were of one ethnicity reported they were white, but this represented less than 1/3 of the overall population.

2010 census 

Hialeah is the tenth-largest city in the United States among cities with a population density of more than 10,000 people per square mile.

As of 2010, there were 74,067 households, with 3.9% being vacant. As of 2000, 36.2% had children under the age of 18 living with them, 57.4% were married couples living together, 17.4% had a female householder with no husband present, and 18.7% were non-families. 14.7% of all households were made up of individuals, and 7.8% had someone living alone who was 65 years of age or older.  The average household size was 3.15 and the average family size was 3.39.

In 2015 through 2016 the population in Hialeah grew from 234,714 to 235,626, a 0.4% increase. The median household income grew from $29,249 to $29,817, a 1.9% increase.

In 2000, the age distribution of the population showed 23.0% under the age of 18, 8.2% from 18 to 24, 29.4% from 25 to 44, 22.9% from 45 to 64, and 16.6% who were 65 years of age or older.  The median age was 43.5 years. For every 100 females, there were 92.7 males.  For every 100 females age 18 and over, there were 89.6 males.

In 2000, the median income for a household in the city was $29,492, and the median income for a family was $31,621. Males had a median income of $23,133 versus $17,886 for females. The per capita income for the city was $12,402.  About 16.0% of families and 18.6% of the population were below the poverty line, including 22.2% of those under age 18 and 22.4% of those age 65 or over.

Hialeah ranks #2 (nearby Hialeah Gardens ranks as #1) in the list of cities in the United States where Spanish is most spoken. As of 2000, 92.14% of the population spoke Spanish at home, while those who spoke only English made up 7.37% of the population. All other languages spoken were below 1% of the population.

Economy

The city of Hialeah is a significant commercial center in Miami-Dade County.  The city is host to national retailers such as Starbucks, Target, Best Buy, Walmart, Lowe's, and The Home Depot, as well as homegrown businesses such as Navarro and Sedano's.

Hialeah is also home to vibrant community of mom-and-pop stores. These shops have successfully competed against national name brand retailers, outfitters, and franchises. In order to remain competitive national businesses have altered their traditional business strategy to meet the demands of the local community. Publix supermarkets opened a Publix Sabor along one of the city's main streets which caters to Latin American and Hispanic clientele. While most of the manufacturing and cloth industries that made Hialeah an industrial city in the 1970s–1980s have disappeared, new electronics and technology businesses have reinvigorated the local economy.

Westland Mall contains over 100 stores and several restaurants. Macy's with a Starbucks in it, IHOP, and J. C. Penney are the main anchor stores located at the mall, while restaurants include Fuddruckers, IHOP, Los Ranchos Steakhouse, Chili's, Manchu Wok, Cuban Guys, Edy's.

Telemundo, the second largest Spanish-language TV network in the United States, was headquartered at 2340 West 8th Avenue in Hialeah until 2018.

Recreation

In March 2009, it was announced that a $40–$90 million restoration project was set to begin within the year on the Hialeah Park Race Track.  On May 7, 2009 the Florida legislature agreed to a deal with the Seminole Tribe of Florida that allowed Hialeah Park to operate slot machines and run Quarter Horse races. The historic racetrack reopened on November 28, 2009 but only for Quarter Horse races. The park installed slot machines in January 2010 as part of a deal to allow for two calendar seasons of racing. The races went on all the way until February 2, 2010. Only a portion of the park has been restored, and an additional $30 million will be needed to complete this first phase of the project. The full transformation is expected to cost $1 billion since the plan includes a complete redevelopment of the surrounding area including the construction of an entertainment complex to include a hotel, restaurants, casinos, stores and a theater. In June 2010 concerns were raised over the preservation of Hialeah Park's historical status, as the planned development threatens to hurt Hialeah Park's status as a National Historic Landmark.

The City of Hialeah is home to three tennis centers, five public swimming pools and aquatic centers, and more than 14 public parks totaling more than  combined. Milander Park features a municipal auditorium and a 10,000 seat football stadium.

Amelia Earhart Park also serves the Hialeah community.  Located just south of the Opa Locka Airport, the park consists of 515 acres, including a five-acre Bark Park for dogs. It offers a variety of amenities, programs and activities including mountain biking, soccer, Tom Sawyer's Play Island and Bill Graham Farm Village. It also houses the new Miami Watersports Complex, which offers cable and boat wakeboarding, waterskiing, wake surfing, kneeboarding and paddleboarding.

Government and infrastructure

The University of Florida College of Dentistry operates the Hialeah Dental Clinic. It opened in 1997 to serve Hispanic populations in South Florida.

Politics

Hialeah is located within Florida's 26th Congressional District. It is currently represented in the House of Representatives by Mario Díaz-Balart, a Republican. A 2005 study by the nonpartisan Bay Area Center for Voting Research (BACVR) ranked Hialeah, Florida as the fourth most conservative city in the United States. The current mayor of Hialeah is Esteban Bovo.

Due to the heavy presence of the Cuban American community Hialeah traditionally, as of 2020, leaned towards Republican politics. In the 2016 United States presidential election in Florida each of the two major candidates received about half of the vote. For the 2020 United States presidential election in Florida about two thirds of residents of Hialeah voted for Trump. Sabrina Rodriguez of Politico wrote "a vote for Trump has become about more than just him, or even the Republican Party. It’s about patriotism."

Education

Public primary and secondary schools

Miami-Dade County Public Schools serves Hialeah.

Two high schools serving the Hialeah community, Mater Academy Charter High School and Miami Lakes Tech, were named as "Silver" award winners in U.S. News & World Reports "Best High Schools 2008 Search".

Private schools

 Champagnat Catholic School – serves mainly southern and south-central Hialeah
 Edison Private School
 Horeb Christian School
 Immaculate Conception School
 Our Lady of Charity School – a private Catholic school not formally associated with the Roman Catholic Church, located in Hialeah
 St. John the Apostle School – serves mainly southern and south-central Hialeah

Post-secondary

Public colleges

 Miami-Dade College Hialeah Campus has served as the city's academic center since 1980. Besides its academic mission, the campus also sponsors numerous cultural and community events.

Private colleges and universities

 ASA College
 College of Business and Technology
 Florida National University

Public library
Hialeah's public library was founded in 1924, one year prior to the incorporation of the city. While over the years the county-wide Miami-Dade Public Library System has taken over the libraries of most of the cities in the county, Hialeah public libraries function independently from the county-wide system.
The first branch was a donation by the Hialeah Women's Club. It was actually located in the house of one of the Hialeah Women's Club's home. The home of Ms. J Sommers Garwood. The club was founded by Ms. Lua Adams Curtiss, who was the late mother of the famous aviator Glenn Curtiss. The club asked for donations to get the library started and was fortunate enough to receive enough to get the system started. The latest branch, John F. Kennedy Library is now the main library for Hialeah and is easily recognizable for its grand murals. In 2017, the branch set out to renovate the entire library and they added new furniture, the art murals, polished terrazzo floors, and new sculptures. The library hosts a print collection, digital resources, and a Hialeah History Collection which collects, preserves and provides access to information about the City of Hialeah's history.

Transportation

In 2013, Hialeah was named a top five city with the worst drivers by Slate and Allstate.

Rail

Hialeah is served by Miami-Dade Transit along major thoroughfares by Metrobus, and by the Miami Metrorail, Tri-Rail, and Amtrak at:

Metrorail:
  Tri-Rail/Metrorail Transfer (North 79th Street and West 37th Avenue)
  Hialeah (East 21st Street and East 1st Avenue)
  Okeechobee (West 19th Street and South Okeechobee Road)

Tri-Rail:
  Tri-Rail/Metrorail Transfer (North 79th Street and West 37th Avenue)
  Hialeah Market (North 41st Street and West 38th Avenue)

Amtrak:
  Amtrak-Miami: Silver Star and Silver Meteor service (North 79th Street and West 37th Avenue)

Road

"All Ways Lead to Hialeah" was one of the city's first slogans. At the time, Glenn Curtiss and James Bright could not have imagined the important link in the transportation chain provided by Hialeah's location. Sitting in the heart of northwest Dade, Hialeah has access to several major thoroughfares, linked by:
 Interstate 75
 State Road 826 (Palmetto Expressway)
 Homestead Extension of Florida's Turnpike
 U.S. Route 27 (Okeechobee Road)
 State Road 924 (Gratigny Parkway)

Notable people

 Alex Avila, Major League Baseball player for Arizona Diamondbacks, drafted by Detroit Tigers
 Terry Borcheller, racing driver
 Devin Bush, NFL free safety for Atlanta Falcons (1995–1998), St. Louis Rams (1999–2000) and Cleveland Browns (2001–2002)
 Maria Canals-Barrera, actress
 Rene Capo, U.S. Olympic representative as a judoka
 Harry Wayne Casey, lead singer of KC and the Sunshine Band, graduate of Hialeah High School
 Chris Corchiani, NBA guard for Orlando Magic picked in second round of 1991 NBA Draft from North Carolina State University; later with Boston Celtics, Washington Bullets
 Nestor Cortes, MLB pitcher for the New York Yankees, 2022 all-star 
 Erik Courtney, Bravo TV personality on Newlyweds: The First Year, born in Hialeah and attended Mae M. Walters Elementary School
 Jack Daugherty, MLB first baseman for Texas Rangers, Houston Astros, Cincinnati Reds and Montreal Expos
 Rohan Davey, NFL quarterback for New England Patriots (2002–2004) and Arizona Cardinals and in NFL Europe World Bowl for Berlin Thunder
 Bucky Dent, professional baseball player for MLB New York Yankees, graduate of Hialeah High School
 Vincent D'Onofrio, actor and producer of stage, film and television, best known as Detective Robert Goren in Law & Order: Criminal Intent and graduate of Hialeah-Miami Lakes High School
 Nick Esasky, MLB infielder for Cincinnati Reds, Boston Red Sox and Atlanta Braves
 Luis Exposito, former Major League Baseball player for the Baltimore Orioles
 Bobby Estalella, MLB catcher for Philadelphia Phillies, San Francisco Giants, New York Yankees, Colorado Rockies, Arizona Diamondbacks and Toronto Blue Jays
 Wifredo A. Ferrer, U.S. attorney for Southern District of Florida, nominated by President Barack Obama
 René García, Hialeah city councilman and Florida State House representative
 Gio González, MLB pitcher for Milwaukee Brewers, drafted by Chicago White Sox in first round, made MLB debut in 2008
 Luchi Gonzalez, coach of FC Dallas
 Ted Hendricks, former professional NFL football player, Hialeah High Class of 1965
 Charlie Hough, former professional baseball player, Hialeah High graduate
 Richard Hough, former professional baseball player, Hialeah High graduate
 Greg Jackson, professional football player
 Catherine Keener, Oscar-nominated actress
 Barbara Lagoa, judge
 Corey Lemonier, Auburn University and NFL defensive end
 Manny Machado, Major League Baseball third baseman for the San Diego Padres
 Lizbet Martínez, Cuban violinist and teacher at M.A. Milam K-8 Center
 Raúl L. Martínez, longest-seated mayor in Hialeah history (1981–2005)
 Maria Molina, meteorologist 
 Oscar Múñoz, MLB pitcher for Minnesota Twins
 Roell Preston,  professional football player
 Mike Rio, professional mixed martial arts fighter
 Julio Robaina, mayor of Hialeah
 Rick Sánchez, CNN anchor/correspondent
 Jon Secada, Grammy Award–winning musician
 Michael Timpson, NFL wide receiver for New England Patriots for six seasons (1989–1994), alumnus of Lakes class of 1985
 Ariel Torres, U.S. Olympic bronze medalist as a karateka
 Rocco Valdes, music producer, songwriter, music manager

See also

Camp Hialeah, a former base of the United States Forces Korea in Busan, South Korea

Notes

References

Bibliography

External links

 City of Hialeah official site
Hialeah Chamber of Commerce official site

 
Cities in Florida
Cities in Miami-Dade County, Florida
Cities in Miami metropolitan area
Cuban-American culture in Florida
Populated places established in 1921
1925 establishments in Florida